The simple-station Calle 26 is part of the TransMilenio mass-transit system of Bogotá, Colombia, opened in the year 2000.

Location 
The station is located in the heart of downtown Bogotá, specifically on Avenida Caracas between Calles 26 and 28.

History 
In 2000, phase one of the TransMilenio system was opened between Portal de la 80 and Tercer Milenio, including this station. The station is named Calle 26 due to its proximity to Avenida El Dorado, also known as Calle 26.

It provides service to passengers from downtown Bogotá and the Centro Internacional de Bogotá. It also serves the neighborhoods of Cementerio Central, Armenia, and Alameda.

The National Museum of Colombia is located about 500 meters from the station.

Station services

Old trunk services

Main line service

Feeder routes 
This station does not have connections to feeder routes.

Inter-city service 
This station does not have inter-city service.

See also
 Bogotá
 TransMilenio
 List of TransMilenio Stations

External links 
 TransMilenio Site
 suRumbo.com

TransMilenio